This is a summary of the electoral history of Peter Fraser, Prime Minister of New Zealand (1940–49), Leader of the Labour Party (1940–50) and Member of Parliament for Wellington Central (1918–46) then Brooklyn (1946–50).

Parliamentary elections

1918 by-election

1919 election

1922 election

1925 election

1928 election

1931 election

1935 election

1938 election

1943 election

1946 election

1949 election

Local elections

1923 local elections

1933 council by-election

1933 local elections

1935 local elections

Leadership elections

1933 Deputy-leadership election

1940 Leadership election

Notes

References

Fraser, Peter